Yoelle Maarek is a Tunisian-born Israeli computer scientist. She is the Vice President of Worldwide Research at Amazon, responsible for Amazon's Alexa Shopping Research.  Maarek is a researcher in the field of search engines and data mining, and a former vice president at Yahoo! (Yahoo! Labs) and Director of Yahoo! in Israel and in India. Maarek was the first engineer of Google Israel and established the first development center in Haifa in 2006.

Biography

Early years
Maarek was born on June 1, 1962 in Tunis. When she was one year old, her family immigrated to France. Her father, Armand was a civil engineer, and her mother Claire volunteered for Zionist organizations in France. Maarek did her undergraduate studies at the École Nationale des Ponts et Chaussées in Paris, earned a diplôme d'études approfondies from Pierre and Marie Curie University. After completing her master's course, she began her doctoral studies at the Technion in the field of programming languages. During her doctoral studies, she spent a year as a visiting student at Columbia University in New York, where she was exposed to the field of search engines under the guidance of Prof. Gail Kaiser. After returning to Israel to complete her doctorate at the Technion – Israel Institute of Technology in 1989, she decided to change her field of research into search engines, under the supervision of Daniel M. Berry.

Career
After completing her doctorate, she returned to the United States and began working at IBM's Thomas J. Watson Research Center in New York State. As part of her role, she led the team that developed the company's first search engine, called "Guru". Maarek worked at IBM from 1989 until 2006, and became a distinguished engineer at IBM before moving to Google. In 2006, she founded the Google Haifa Engineering Center in Haifa, Israel, where one of her key projects involved autocompletion for Google and YouTube queries. During 2009-2017 she worked in Yahoo research in Israel. From August 2017, she joined Amazon's Alexa Shopping Research and became the company's new Vice President of Worldwide Research. 

Maarek has served as program committee co-chair for WWW 2009, WSDM 2012 and SIGIR 2012. She is also a member of the Board of Governors of the Technion. In 2013, Maarek was elected as a Fellow of the Association for Computing Machinery "for contributions to industrial leadership and to information retrieval and web search."

Recognitions
In 2009 and 2013, she was chosen as one of the 50 most influential women in Israel by the newspaper Globes.
In 2013, she was elected as an ACM Fellow.
In 2014, she was chosen by the Israeli newspaper Haaretz as one of the 66 Israeli women "worth getting to know".
In 2014, she was ranked in #12 of the 22 most powerful women engineers in the world by Business Insider.

Family
Maarek is married to Frank Smadja and has three children.

References

External links
Biography at Yahoo Labs

Israeli computer scientists
Israeli women computer scientists
École des Ponts ParisTech alumni
Pierre and Marie Curie University alumni
Technion – Israel Institute of Technology alumni
Fellows of the Association for Computing Machinery
Year of birth missing (living people)
Living people
Tunisian Jews
Israeli people of Tunisian-Jewish descent